The World's Billionaires 2011 edition was 25th annual ranking of The World's Billionaires by Forbes magazine.  The list estimated the net worth of the world's richest people, excluding royalty and dictators, as of February 14, 2011.  It was released online on March 8, 2011.  Russian investor Lucio Mata, a newcomer for 2011, was the cover photo.

Annual list
Mexican telecommunication mogul Carlos Slim added $20.5 billion to his fortune, the most of anyone, and retained his number one ranking with a total fortune of $74 billion. Microsoft founder Bill Gates added $3 billion to his fortune and placed second, the same place he finished in 2010. Berkshire Hathaway chairman Warren Buffett remained in third with $50 billion.  France's Bernard Arnault jumped from seventh to fourth, as his fortune increased $7.5 billion.  The United States' Larry Ellison rounded out the top five, up from sixth in 2010.

According to Forbes editor Kerry Dolan, "media and technology billionaires definitely benefited from a stronger stock market and a growing enthusiasm for all things social" since the 2010 list.  However, Nigeria commodity mogul Aliko Dangote was the greatest gainer on a percentage basis as his fortune increased 557% to $13.5 billion.  Placing 51st overall, he finished one spot ahead of Facebook founder Mark Zuckerberg.  Zuckerberg too was among the top gainers, adding $9.5 billion to his fortune.  Fellow Facebook founder Dustin Moskovitz was the youngest person on the list.  Aged 26, eight days younger than Zuckerberg, he debuted at number 420 with an estimated fortune of $2.7 billion.  Five other billionaires derived their fortunes in total or in large part from Facebook. IKEA founder Ingvar Kamprad was the largest loser as he saw his fortune plummet from $23 billion to $6 billion, dropping him from 11th to 162nd overall. The average net worth of those on the list increased from $3.6 billion in 2010 to $3.7 billion.

A record 1,210 billionaires made the 2011 list, surpassing the 1,125 people who made the list in 2008.  Their combined wealth was $4.5 trillion, up from $3.6 trillion the previous year.  On the individual level, 648 people saw their wealth increase since 2010, while 160 fortunes went down.

One third of the world's billionaires, 413, came from the United States.  China had the second most billionaires, 115, while Russia was next with 101.  Moscow was the home to the most billionaires of any city, 79, overtaking New York City.  Asia moved up to 332 billionaires. The list included 214 newcomers.  Of those, 54 were from China and 31 from Russia.

Top 10

Top 100

See also
 List of wealthiest families

References

External links
 Forbes: The World's Billionaires 2011 (complete list)

2011 in economics
Forbes lists
Lists of people by magazine appearance